Dlouhé stráně Hydro Power Plant is a large pumped storage plant in the Czech Republic, located on the Desná river. It has the largest reversing water turbine in Europe

References

External links

Dams completed in 1996
Energy infrastructure completed in 1996
Hydroelectric power stations in the Czech Republic
Pumped-storage hydroelectric power stations in the Czech Republic